Ferenc Buday (born January 29, 1951, in Budapest) is a Hungarian handball coach and former handball player who competed at the 1976 Summer Olympics.

In 1976 he was part of the Hungarian team which finished sixth in the Olympic tournament. He played all five matches and scored five goals.

References

External links

1951 births
Living people
Handball players from Budapest
Hungarian male handball players
Hungarian handball coaches
Olympic handball players of Hungary
Handball players at the 1976 Summer Olympics